Theofilos Tomazos (born 30 August 1901, date of death unknown) was a Greek wrestler. He competed in the men's freestyle welterweight at the 1928 Summer Olympics.

References

External links
 

1901 births
Year of death missing
Greek male sport wrestlers
Olympic wrestlers of Greece
Wrestlers at the 1928 Summer Olympics
People from Famagusta District